is one of Japan's wealthiest citizens with a fortune estimated to exceed $500 million. He is a controversial figure in Japanese political and commercial life.

Itoyama has served four terms as a member of the Diet, the Japanese Parliament with nearly twenty years of active involvement in the ruling party, the Liberal Democratic Party. He was a principal figure in a 1974 bribery scandal that resulted in the arrests of more than 90 people, including a senior vice president of Itoyama's company, and Peter Herzog characterized Itoyama as "one of the worst offenders" in having a "cavalier attitude" toward Japanese election laws.

In 1989 he was included in Forbes top ten richest people, he placed 10th, however by 1991 he had drop off the list. 

Itoyama became the single largest shareholder in Japan Airlines in February 1998 and publicly called for significant changes to management and business structures. He traveled to the United States and began negotiating the sale of JAL hotel properties such as the Ihilani Resort & Spa in Honolulu and the Essex House in New York, despite having no actual authority to do so. JAL management moved to compromise with Itoyama by appointing him Special Adviser to the Chief Executive Officer in exchange for Itoyama's giving up the right to object to management decisions at shareholder meetings. He sold half of his JAL stake on the open market in 2006 after the company failed to pay dividends for two years in a row.

He is a best-selling author, with books on political and business subjects, and is the chairman and benefactor of an eponymous educational institution.

References

External links 
 Forbes.com: Forbes World's Richest People
 Personal website

|-

1942 births
Living people
Business writers
Businesspeople from Tokyo
Japan Airlines
Japanese billionaires
Japanese investors
Japanese political writers
Japanese non-fiction writers
Liberal Democratic Party (Japan) politicians
Members of the House of Councillors (Japan)
Members of the House of Representatives (Japan)
Politicians from Tokyo
Writers from Tokyo